Farshad Faraji (born 7 April 1994) is an Iranian professional footballer who plays as Centr-back for Persian Gulf Pro League club Persepolis and Iran national team.

Club career

Rah Ahan 
Faraji joined Rah Ahan in summer 2014 with a contract until 2017. He made his professional debut for Rah Ahan on January 30, 2015 in 2-0 loss against Foolad as a substitute for Mohsen Mirabi.

Persepolis 
On 15 March 2021, Faraji signed a 2.5-year contract with Persian Gulf Pro League champions Persepolis.

Career statistics

Honours 
Persepolis
Persian Gulf Pro League (1): 2020–21
Iranian Super Cup (1): 2020 ; Runner-up (1); 2021

References

External links 

 Farshad Faraji at IranLeague.ir
 Faraji on soccerway

1994 births
Living people
Iranian footballers
Rah Ahan players
Persepolis F.C. players
Association football defenders
People from Qaem Shahr
Sportspeople from Mazandaran province
Persian Gulf Pro League players